Paul Arthur Clemens (born February 14, 1988) is an American former professional baseball pitcher. He previously played in Major League Baseball (MLB) for the Houston Astros, Miami Marlins and San Diego Padres.

Early years
Clemens attended James W. Robinson, Jr. Secondary School in Fairfax, Virginia where he lettered three years under head baseball coach Bill Evers.  While at Robinson, Clemens broke Javier López's single-game strikeout record by recording 16 strikeouts against Socastee High School in Myrtle Beach, South Carolina.

Clemens played summer baseball for the Virginia Barnstormers.  During his senior year at James W. Robinson, Clemens accepted a baseball scholarship to Western Carolina University, but later decided that junior college was a better option. Clemens attended Louisburg College in North Carolina, where he pitched for two seasons. Clemens' tall frame and naturally live arm attracted the attention of MLB scouts early on in his college career.

Professional career

Atlanta Braves
Clemens was drafted in the 36th-round (1089 overall) by the San Francisco Giants in 2007, but he chose to return to school for another year. He was drafted by the Atlanta Braves in the seventh round of the 2008 MLB Draft.

Houston Astros
On July 31, 2011, Clemens, Jordan Schafer, Brett Oberholtzer and Juan Abreu were traded to the Houston Astros for Michael Bourn.

Clemens was added to the Astros 40-man roster on November 18, 2011. In 2013, Clemens earned a 4–6 record. He pitched the last game of the 2013 Houston Astros season when they played the New York Yankees. He lost to former Astro Andy Pettitte in Pettite's last game. Clemens was designated for assignment by the Astros on September 2, 2014.

Philadelphia Phillies
Clemens signed a minor league deal with the Philadelphia Phillies on November 20, 2014.

Kansas City Royals
He was then released after making 7 appearances and signed on with the Kansas City Royals.

Miami Marlins
On November 30, Clemens signed a minor league deal with the Miami Marlins.

San Diego Padres
On June 28, 2016, Clemens was claimed off waivers by the San Diego Padres.

On August 6, 2016, Clemens was pulled from the 5th inning of a game against the Philadelphia Phillies for failing to run out a bunt. Earlier in the game, he had gotten pine tar on his original jersey and switched to a new one, number 91, which read "Player" on the back. He was released on March 20th, 2017.

Minnesota Twins
Clemens signed with the Minnesota Twins for the rest of the 2017 season. On July 21, 2017, Clemens was released by the Minnesota Twins.

Leones de Yucatán
On March 11, 2018, Clemens signed with the Leones de Yucatán of the Mexican Baseball League. He was released on April 23, 2018.

Southern Maryland Blue Crabs
On May 11, 2018, Clemens signed with the Southern Maryland Blue Crabs of the Atlantic League of Professional Baseball. He became a free agent following the 2018 season.

High Point Rockers
On April 11, 2019, Clemens signed with the High Point Rockers of the Atlantic League of Professional Baseball. He was released on September 16, 2019.

Personal life
Clemens is married to Marlee Clemens. They have three children.

References

External links

1988 births
Living people
American expatriate baseball players in Mexico
Baseball players from Columbia, South Carolina
Clearwater Threshers players
Corpus Christi Hooks players
Danville Braves players
Gulf Coast Braves players
High Point Rockers players
Houston Astros players
Lehigh Valley IronPigs players
Leones de Yucatán players
Major League Baseball pitchers
Mexican League baseball pitchers
Miami Marlins players
Mississippi Braves players
Myrtle Beach Pelicans players
New Orleans Zephyrs players
Northwest Arkansas Naturals players
Oklahoma City RedHawks players
Omaha Storm Chasers players
Rome Braves players
San Diego Padres players
Southern Maryland Blue Crabs players
Tiburones de La Guaira players
American expatriate baseball players in Venezuela
Louisburg Hurricanes baseball players